Rod Smallwood may refer to:
 Rod Smallwood (medical engineer) (born 1945), British medical engineer
 Rod Smallwood (born 1950), English music manager